Adelina Ungureanu (born July 29, 2000) is a Romanian volleyball player, a member of the Romania women's national volleyball team and Italian club Unionvolley Pinerolo. She competed at the 2019 Women's European Volleyball Championship and at the 2021 Women's European Volleyball Championship.

References 

2000 births
Living people
Romanian women's volleyball players
Sportspeople from Botoșani